Israel Crane, of the Crane Family, was a merchant who lived in Cranetown (modern-day Montclair, New Jersey). He was born in 1774 and died in 1858.

Business Ventures
Israel Crane was originally a businessman, and operated a general store on the corner of what is now Glen Ridge Avenue and Lackawanna Plaza in what was then Cranetown. He was considered to be the wealthiest man in his area. Crane also headed the Morris Canal. In addition, Crane was president of the Newark and Bloomfield Turnpike (now known as the Newark-Pompton Turnpike) Company, founded in 1806. These business ventures were passed down to Crane's youngest son, James.

Legacy
Crane's presence is still felt in Montclair today. His residence, the Crane House and Museum, still stands today, albeit in a different location than its original site. In addition, his family name is still seen on Montclair's town crest.

References

People from Montclair, New Jersey
1774 births
1858 deaths